[[File:Anne Boleyn London Tower.jpg|thumb|right|200px|Anne Boleyn in the Tower, 1835, now in the Musée Rolin in Autun]]
François Barthélemy Michel Édouard Cibot (1799–1877) was a French historical and landscape painter born in Paris. His masters were Guérin and Picot. During the first part of his career he devoted himself to historical painting, producing many sacred works, several specimens of which are to be seen in the churches of Paris. His most
important work of this kind is the series of paintings representing Charity, in the church of St. Leu at Paris. About 1863 he applied himself to landscape painting. He died in Paris in 1877. Amongst his best works are:The Loves of the Angels. 1835.Regina Coeli. 1846.St. Theresa. 1847.Convicts in 1788. 1836.Chestnut-trees at Aulnay. 1855.Park at Orsay. 1857.The Gouffre, near Seineport. 1864. (In the Luxembourg Gallery.)View at Soisy-sur-Ecolle''. 1865.

Gallery

References

External links
 

1799 births
1877 deaths
Painters from Paris
19th-century French painters
French male painters
19th-century French male artists
18th-century French male artists